Trachytes is a genus of mites in the family Trachytidae.

Species
The following species are part of the genus Trachytes:

 Trachytes adrianaea Hutu, 2000     
 Trachytes aegrota (C.L.Koch, 1841)     
 Trachytes aegrotasimilis Hutu, 2001     
 Trachytes aokii Hiramatsu, 1979     
 Trachytes arcuatus Hirschmann & Zirngiebl-Nicol, 1969     
 Trachytes augusta Hutu, 2000     
 Trachytes balazyi Wisniewski & Hirschmann, 1994     
 Trachytes baloghi Hirschmann & Zirngiebl-Nicol, 1969     
 Trachytes canadiensis Hutu, 2001     
 Trachytes decui Hutu, 1983     
 Trachytes edleri Hutu, 1983     
 Trachytes elegans Hirschmann & Zirngiebl-Nicol, 1969     
 Trachytes eustructura Hirschmann & Zirngiebl-Nicol, 1969     
 Trachytes hiramatsui Hutu, 1983     
 Trachytes hirschmanni Hutu, 1973     
 Trachytes hokkaidoensis Hiramatsu, 1980     
 Trachytes inermis Trägårdh, 1910     
 Trachytes irenae Pecina, 1970     
 Trachytes jilinensis Ma, 2001     
 Trachytes kaliszewskii Bloszyk & Szymkowiak, 1996     
 Trachytes krantzi Hutu, 2001     
 Trachytes lambda Berlese, 1904     
 Trachytes lindquisti Hutu, 2001     
 Trachytes marilynae Hutu, 2001     
 Trachytes micropunctata Hutu, 1973     
 Trachytes minima Trägårdh, 1910     
 Trachytes minimasimilis Masan, 1999     
 Trachytes montana Willmann, 1953     
 Trachytes mystacinus Berlese, 1910     
 Trachytes nortoni Hutu, 2001     
 Trachytes onishii Hiramatsu, 1980     
 Trachytes oudemansi Hirschmann & Zirngiebl-Nicol, 1969     
 Trachytes pauperior Berlese, 1914     
 Trachytes pecinai Hutu, 1983     
 Trachytes pi Berlese, 1910     
 Trachytes romanica Hutu, 1983     
 Trachytes splendida Hutu, 1973     
 Trachytes stammeni Hirschmann & Zirngiebl-Nicol, 1969     
 Trachytes tesquorum Pecina, 1980     
 Trachytes traegardhi Hirschmann & Zirngiebl-Nicol, 1969     
 Trachytes tuberifer Berlese, 1914     
 Trachytes welbourni Moraza, 1989     
 Trachytes wisniewskii Hutu, 1983     
 Trachytes yinsuigongi Ma, 2001

References

Mesostigmata